All Night Long (Loud & Clear in the UK) is Sammy Hagar's first live album, released in 1978. The album was recorded during concerts in San Francisco, San Antonio, San Bernardino, Santa Cruz and Santa Monica.

All Night Long was not released in the UK until 1979 under a new title, Loud & Clear, and with new cover artwork. Additionally, a live version of Montrose's "Space Station #5" was added to the end of the album.

Track listings

Vinyl & cassette edition

CD edition

Song information 
 The only song from Hagar's first solo album, Nine on a Ten Scale, is the Donovan cover, "Young Girl Blues".
 "Red" and "Rock 'n' Roll Weekend" were both originally found on Hagar's second studio album, Sammy Hagar.
 "Reckless" and "Turn Up the Music" were both originally found on Hagar's third studio album Musical Chairs.
 "I've Done Everything for You" is a Hagar original, which went on to be a hit single for Rick Springfield.
 Three tracks from Montrose's first album, Montrose, appear in this collection: "Make It Last", "Bad Motor Scooter" and, from the UK version only, "Space Station #5".
 All tracks minus "Young Girl Blues" were re-released as part of the Red Hot! compilation.

Personnel 
Adapted from Discogs.
 Sammy Hagar – lead vocals, guitar
 Gary Pihl – guitar, backing vocals
 Bill Church – bass guitar, backing vocals
 Denny Carmassi – drums
 Alan Fitzgerald – keyboards, backing vocals

Production
Sammy Hagar, John Carter – Production
Ken Perry – Mastering
Richard Digby Smith, Steve Thompson – Engineering
Warren Dewey – Assistant Engineer
Dennis Callahan, Michael N. Marks, Randy Bachman – band photography
Roy Kohara – Art Direction
Michael Zagaris - photography

Releases
 1978 Capitol US SMAS-11812
 1978 Capitol US SN-16326 
 1978 Capitol Germany 1C 064-85 594 
 1979 Capitol UK E-ST 25330 (as "Loud & Clear") 
 1979 Capitol Holland 1A 062-86063 (as "Loud & Clear") 
 1992 BGO Records UK BGOCD149 (as "Loud & Clear")
 1996 One Way Records US 72438 19094 23  
 2016 Rock Candy Records US 241159 3914

References

External links
 Sammy Hagar official website
 Red Rocker Discography

Sammy Hagar albums
1978 live albums
1979 live albums
Capitol Records live albums